Raoul II, Lord of Coucy (died 1250) was a son of Enguerrand III and his wife Maria of Oisy.  In 1246 he succeeded his father as lord of Coucy.  Raoul died at the Battle of Mansurah in Egypt during the Seventh Crusade.

Raoul married Elisabeth, daughter of Walter III of Châtillon, and later remarried to Philippe of Dammartin, daughter of Simon of Dammartin.

References

Sources

1250 deaths
Christians of the Sixth Crusade
Christians of the Seventh Crusade
Lords of Coucy
Year of birth unknown